Lee Konitz Plays with the Gerry Mulligan Quartet (also released as Konitz Meets Mulligan) is a compilation album by saxophonist and bandleader Gerry Mulligan's Quartet with Lee Konitz featuring performances recorded in early-1953. The records on the album were originally released on 10-inch LPs Lee Konitz Plays with the Gerry Mulligan Quartet and Lee Konitz and the Gerry Mulligan Quartet on Pacific Jazz Records along with previously-unreleased tracks and alternate takes.

Reception

The AllMusic review by Ron Wynn called it "A simply wonderful pairing of idiosyncratic talents".

Track listing
 "Too Marvelous for Words" (Richard A. Whiting, Johnny Mercer) – 3:36 Originally released on PJLP 10		
 "Lover Man" (Jimmy Davis, Ram Ramirez, Jimmy Sherman) – 3:01 Originally released on PJLP 2 		
 "I'll Remember April" (Gene de Paul, Patricia Johnston, Don Raye) – 4:08 
 "These Foolish Things" (Jack Strachey, Holt Marvell, Harry Link) – 3:15 Originally released on PJLP 10
 "All the Things You Are" (Jerome Kern, Oscar Hammerstein II) – 3:55
 "Bernie's Tune" (Bernie Miller, Jerry Leiber, Mike Stoller) – 3:32 Bonus track on CD reissue 		
 "Almost Like Being in Love" (Frederick Loewe, Alan Jay Lerner) – 2:50 Originally released on PJLP 10 		
 "Sextet" (Gerry Mulligan) – 2:59 Originally released on PJLP 2
 "Broadway" (Billy Bird, Teddy McRae, Henry J. Wood) – 2:54 Originally released on PJLP 10 		
 "I Can't Believe That You're in Love with Me" (Jimmy McHugh, Clarence Gaskill) – 3:05 Originally released on PJLP 2
 "Oh, Lady Be Good!" (George Gershwin, Ira Gershwin) – 2:38 Originally released on PJLP 2	
 "Oh, Lady Be Good!" [alternate take] (Gershwin, Gershwin) – 1:52 Bonus track on CD reissue 
Recorded at the Haig, Los Angeles California on January 23, 1953 (tracks 1–6) at an unidentified studio in Los Angeles, California. on January 30, 1953 (tracks 7–9) and at Phil Turetsky's home studio, Los Angeles, California on February 1, 1953 (tracks 10–12)

Personnel
Lee Konitz – alto saxophone
Gerry Mulligan – baritone saxophone - backgrounds 1-6
Chet Baker – trumpet - backgrounds 1-6
Joe Mondragon (tracks 10–12), Carson Smith (tracks 1–9) – bass
Larry Bunker – drums

Charts

References

Gerry Mulligan albums
Lee Konitz albums
1957 albums
Pacific Jazz Records albums